Koduvally is a major municipal town in Kozhikode district. It is located on the Calicut-Mysuru National Highway 766 (NH 766) and is about 21 km northeast of Kozhikode (Calicut) city. koduvally is known as the city of gold for its gold trade legacy since 18s and 19s. Koduvally is one of the 140 assembly constituencies in Kerala and One of the 12 block panchayats in kozhikode.The nearest local bodies are Kizhakkoth, Madavoor, kunnamangalam, Omassery, Mukkam, and Thamarassery. Koduvally also gives its name to the Koduvally River which flows west into the sea.

History
The road between Koduvally and Kozhikode was improved in the early 1970s and the Koduvally Bridge was built. Koduvally was a major town in Calicut district during the period of british. Koduvally is known as the city of gold for its gold trade legacy.  Koduvally legislative constituency was represented by E. Ahmed (former minister of government of India) in 1977. The karoonji mala viewpoint in Koduvally is a tourist destination, some says that tipu sultan and army lived in this mountain during war between British.

Koduvally Assembly Constituency
Koduvally Assembly constituency consists of the Panchayats Kizhakkoth, Madavoor, Narikkuni, Omassery, Kattippara, Thamarassery, and Koduvally Municipality.
Karat Abdul Razak of independent with support LDF government is the MLA of koduvally 
In the 2016 Assembly elections he defeated MA RAZAK MASTER, MUSLIM LEEGUE at a margin of lower than 1000 votes. The present MP (member of parliament) E. Ahamed represented Koduvally constituency in 1977. C. Moyinkutty, C. Mammootty  also represented Koduvally Legislative Assembly.

History of Koduvally Assembly Constituency

Landmarks
Koduvally contains a mini stadium, and branches of the State Bank of India, the Federal Bank, Canara bank, Syndicate Bank, IndusInd Bank, Koduvally service Co-operative bank, Kozhikode District Co-operative Bank, a police station and office of circle inspector of police, Koduvally Muslim Orphanage, the KMO Arts and Science College and the Phoenix Pain and Palliative Care Society, Koduvally higher secondary school and more than 5 LP schools, Koduvally government college, a mini civil station which contains the block panchayat, pension office, village office and regional transport office (KL-57), a community health centre, KSEB main office, a municipality office and food safety department office in the municipality building at Koduvally bus stand.

Economy
Koduvally has the reputation of having 100 jewelers within a short space of one kilometer.  This little town has the biggest market for smuggled gold ornaments in the whole state.  Most of the gold arriving here comes through black market routes. UnaisOne is a conglomerate headquartered the Koduvally city.

Educational Institutions 
Koduvally having a wide range of Educational Institution in the heart of city in within short distance having Worlds famous Technical & management institutions.
 Government Higher Secondary School
 KMO Higher Secondary School
 KMO English Medium High School
 CHMKM Government Arts and Science College
 KMO Arts and Science College
 KMO Industrial Training Institute
 KMO College of Teacher Education
 Koduvally GOVT ALP School (Also Known as Cheriya school)
 Government Residential ITI, Kalaranthiri

Notable people 
 Karat Abdul Razak, Politician
 Thahir Zaman, Footballer

See also
 Kunnamangalam
 Thamarassery
 Omassery
 Puthuppadi
 Thiruvambady
 Mukkam
 Mavoor
 Koyilandy
 Balussery
 Chamal
 Avilora
 Perumpilavu

References

External links

Cities and towns in Kozhikode district
Thamarassery area
Kozhikode east